Fisher Investments is an independent money management firm headquartered in Camas, Washington.

History
Ken Fisher founded the firm in 1979, incorporated in 1986, then served as CEO until July 2016, when he was succeeded by long-time Fisher Investments employee Damian Ornani. Fisher remains active as the firm's executive chairman and co-chief investment officer.

As of June 2021, Fisher Investments and its subsidiaries manage over $188 billion in assets for individual and institutional investors globally. The firm maintains four principal business units: Fisher Investments Institutional Group, Fisher Investments Private Client Group, Fisher Investments 401(k) Solutions Group and Fisher Investments International Group.

The firm incorporated Fisher Investments Europe Limited in 1999 with its headquarters in London. Later it expanded the firm's US operations by opening offices in Vancouver, Washington; Plano, Texas; and Tampa, Florida. In 2005, the firm was reorganized as a Delaware limited liability company. The firm also entered into a joint venture in Germany to offer investment services as Grüner Fisher Investments GmbH, which is now a wholly owned subsidiary of Fisher Investments.

In late 2011, Fisher Investments opened a new headquarters on the 120-acre Fisher Creek campus in Camas, Washington. Over the next three years, Fisher Investments expanded its local presence by constructing two additional buildings on the Fisher Creek campus. In 2020, the company opened a fourth building on the campus. The five-story building has room for an additional 1,100 employees.

Fisher Investments has also opened international offices, including locations in the United Kingdom, Ireland, Germany, Japan, Dubai, and Australia. Fisher Investments’ global footprint requires significant effort to localize content for non-English-speaking clients. The firm translates content into Dutch, French, German, Italian, Spanish, Danish, Swedish, Finnish, Korean, Chinese and Japanese.

Corporate culture
In 2020, Fisher Investments was certified as a Great Place to Work® by the global workplace culture firm Great Place to Work. Separately, in 2019, Fisher Investments' office in Plano, Texas was recognized as one of the Best Workplaces in Texas™.

According to a 2019 Bloomberg article based on anonymous interviews with former and current Fisher Investments' employees, the company's workers are held to vague targets and some employees contend there is a culture of fear and stress. The pressure on employees to acquire and retain clients is said to be particularly intense. In late 2019, Ken Fisher came under fire for sexualized comments, losing billions as customers withdrew funds in protest.

Ratings and awards
For seven consecutive years (2014–2020) the firm was recognized as one of the top 300 US-based Registered Investment Advisors (RIAs) in Financial Times' Top 300 list. The survey ranks money managers with at least $300 million total assets under management.

In 2019 and 2020, Financial Times and Ignites Research recognized Fisher Investments as one of its Top Retirement Advisers in its FT 401 list. The line-up is described as "a list of elite professionals who specialize in advising US employers on their defined contribution plans."

In 2016, Fisher Investments ranked #164 on the Pensions and Investments/Towers Watson list of the World's 500 largest money managers.

Grüner Fisher Investments was rated "Best Employer in the (German) Financial Sector" in 2015 by the German investment magazine, Cash.Online, and again in 2016 by the magazine Das Investment. The honor is based on a survey of employees across 115 different companies, ranked on 13 individual factors including career opportunities, work climate and atmosphere.

Fisher Investments Europe, a wholly owned subsidiary of Fisher Investments, was recognized by ADVFN as Wealth Manager of the Year in its International Financial Awards, announced March 8, 2016. The awards aim to recognize and celebrate best of breed products and services from across the financial industry, both nationally and internationally.

References 

American companies established in 1979
Financial services companies established in 1979
Investment management companies of the United States
Privately held companies based in Washington (state)
Camas, Washington